Brinkman is an unincorporated community in Greer County, Oklahoma, United States. It lies at the western terminus of State Highway 34B, nine miles north of Mangum and one mile west of U.S. Route 283.

History
Brinkman was founded in 1910, and named after John Brinkman, who was a business associate of railroad builders Joseph A. Kemp and Frank Kell. A post office opened on June 17, 1910, and by 1925 the high school had over 450 students.

It was a market town for the surrounding area and had two large elevators as well as other amenities. But the bank closed in 1927, and a fire destroyed half the town in 1929. Most of the buildings were never rebuilt. Oklahoma State Highway 34, constructed in 1931, bypassed the town to the east, accelerating the decline.

The school closed in 1957.  On December 30, 1965 the post office closed. The school building had been removed and the school district consolidated into a still larger unit. In 1972 the railroad that started the town was abandoned, and in 1974 the tracks were taken up. With the end of this activity Brinkman ceased to exist. By 1980 there were only a few residents left here. Today, all that remains there are a few old buildings and a very small population. Brinkman is now considered a ghost town.

A community historical marker was erected in 2012.

Geography
Brinkman is located at an elevation of 1,693 feet (516 m).

References

External links
 History of Farming in Brinkman
 History of Transportation in Brinkman

Geography of Greer County, Oklahoma
Ghost towns in Oklahoma
Unincorporated communities in Oklahoma